Alfredo Pussetto (born 2 October 1994) is an Argentine professional footballer who plays as a midfielder for Unión Santa Fe.

Career
Pussetto began his career with Atlético de Rafaela, with the midfielder being promoted into their first-team squad under manager Juan Manuel Llop in 2016–17. His professional debut arrived on 22 June 2017 against Tigre, prior to Pussetto netting his first goal during his second appearance three days after versus Sarmiento. His first campaign with Rafaela ended with relegation to Primera B Nacional. In January 2018, Pussetto completed a move to Chilean Primera División side Deportes Temuco. He rejoined Rafaela six months later without featuring for the Chileans, though had been an unused sub once in the Copa Sudamericana.

In mid-2019, Pussetto joined Argentine Primera División outfit Unión Santa Fe.

Personal life
Pussetto is the brother of fellow professional footballer Ignacio Pussetto.

Career statistics
.

References

External links

1994 births
Living people
People from San Martín Department, Santa Fe
Argentine footballers
Association football midfielders
Argentine expatriate footballers
Expatriate footballers in Chile
Argentine expatriate sportspeople in Chile
Argentine Primera División players
Primera Nacional players
Atlético de Rafaela footballers
Deportes Temuco footballers
Unión de Santa Fe footballers
Sportspeople from Santa Fe Province